Balé Mulato (Portuguese for Mulatto ballet) is the eighth studio album by Brazilian axé/MPB singer Daniela Mercury, released in 2005 in Brazil through EMI. Although it was not very successful in music charts, it sold almost 60,000 copies in Brazil, earning a gold certification.

Track listing

Charts

Certification

References

External links 
 
 [ A review of the album] at Allmusic

2005 albums
Daniela Mercury albums